The Cathedral of the Nativity of the Most Holy Mother of God and the Holy Royal Martyrs is a Russian Orthodox Church Outside Russia cathedral on Harvard Road in the London Borough of Hounslow. The cathedral is dedicated to the Nativity of the Theotokos and of the Holy Royal Martyrs (the last Romanovs), who were killed in July 1918 by Russian Bolsheviks.

The Cathedral was opened in 1999, with a lesser consecration taking place in 2003, and a full consecration taking place in 2005.

History 
In early 1920, the Russian Orthodox Church Outside Russia was established. In 1928, Bishop Nicholas Karpoff became the first Orthodox Bishop of London.

In 1959, the Russian Orthodox Church In Exile Cathedral was opened on Emperor’s Gate, London; it shut down in 1989. 11 years after the closure of the Cathedral on Emperor's Lane, the Cathedral of the Nativity of the Most Holy Mother of God and the Holy Royal Martyrs was opened. It was fully consecrated in 2005.

Liturgy 
Divine Liturgy is mainly held in the Russian Orthodox Church Outside Russia's liturgical language, Church Slavonic. The Sunday Sermon is preached in Russian.

References 

Russian Orthodox Church Outside of Russia
Cathedrals in London
Church buildings with domes